Piney Point (also known simply as "The Point"), is an unincorporated community and census-designated place in St. Mary's County, Maryland, United States. It is known for the Paul Hall Center for Maritime Training and Education, houses along the beach, a lighthouse, and a museum. The Piney Point post office also serves St. George Island, which is connected to Piney Point by a short bridge.

Demographics

History
The scenic environment of Piney Point continues to be the summer getaway of many Washington D.C. notables. Named after the long-leaf yellow and loblolly pines lining the shores of the Potomac River, the Point provided a nature retreat for Presidents James Monroe, Franklin Pierce and Teddy Roosevelt. A number of other Capital figures such as Henry Clay, John C. Calhoun and Daniel Webster were frequent visitors to the Piney Point Hotel, which was shut down after a hurricane in 1933.

In the early 1940s Piney Point was also home to the U.S. Navy Torpedo Test Range. The Navy base was situated on the property, which is now the Paul Hall Center for Maritime Training. The small cottage-type homes located across from the maritime school were originally housing for Navy enlisted men and their families. The two-story homes along Stark Drive served as housing for Navy officers. The Navy base included a hospital, bowling alley, motor pool, and ships' dock. Many of the unmarried Navy members lived on large ships anchored in St. George Creek.

References

Census-designated places in St. Mary's County, Maryland
Census-designated places in Maryland